Blue Mound is a city in Tarrant County, Texas, United States. The population was 2,394 as of the 2010 census.

History
The community's history dates back to the 1920s, when Scottish immigrant John Kennedy established Globe Laboratories, Inc. to produce serum to immunize cattle against blackleg, a disease that affected calves under two years of age. About ten years later, he sold the company to his partner. Kennedy later purchased  of land in an area bordered by East McLeroy Boulevard on the north and FM 156 (Blue Mound Road) to the east. His interest in aircraft led him to create the Globe Aircraft Company. As his operation grew, more and more people began to settle near his plant. The settlement was initially known as Saginaw Park, but later took the name Blue Mound after a nearby hill. During the 1950s, Bell Helicopter used the Kennedy facility to develop its new helicopters, but the company left the facility in 1960. Blue Mound incorporated in 1957 and had a population of 1,253 by the 1960 census. That figure had risen to 1,283 by 1970 and 2,169 in 1980 as the city became a bedroom community for those employed in Fort Worth and the surrounding area. The 1990 census showed a slight decline in population, to 2,133. By 2000, the number of inhabitants had risen to 2,388.

Geography

According to the United States Census Bureau, the city has a total area of 0.5 square miles (1.4 km2), all of it land.

Climate
The climate in this area is characterized by hot, humid summers and generally mild to cool winters.  According to the Köppen Climate Classification system, Blue Mound has a humid subtropical climate, abbreviated "Cfa" on climate maps.

Demographics

As of the census of 2000, there were 2,388 people, 779 households, and 614 families residing in the city. The population density was 4,445.8 people per square mile (1,707.4/km2). There were 790 housing units at an average density of 1,470.8 per square mile (564.9/km2). The racial makeup of the city was 76.72% White, 1.34% African American, 0.88% Native American, 0.42% Asian, 0.38% Pacific Islander, 17.09% from other races, and 3.18% from two or more races. Hispanic or Latino of any race were 30.36% of the population.

There were 779 households, out of which 40.4% had children under the age of 18 living with them, 61.5% were married couples living together, 11.7% had a female householder with no husband present, and 21.1% were non-families. 17.8% of all households were made up of individuals, and 6.0% had someone living alone who was 65 years of age or older. The average household size was 3.07 and the average family size was 3.44.

In the city, the population was spread out, with 31.0% under the age of 18, 9.8% from 18 to 24, 31.2% from 25 to 44, 20.9% from 45 to 64, and 7.2% who were 65 years of age or older. The median age was 32 years. For every 100 females, there were 100.2 males. For every 100 females age 18 and over, there were 94.7 males.

The median income for a household in the city was $45,250, and the median income for a family was $47,011. Males had a median income of $31,898 versus $22,989 for females. The per capita income for the city was $16,553. About 5.9% of families and 7.2% of the population were below the poverty line, including 5.8% of those under age 18 and 15.6% of those age 65 or over.

Education

Public education in the city of Blue Mound is provided by the Eagle Mountain-Saginaw Independent School District. Zoned campuses include Gilliland Elementary School (grades PK–5), which is located in the city of Blue Mound, Highland Middle School (grades 6–8), and Saginaw High School (grades 9–12), which are in the city of Saginaw.

References

External links

Dallas–Fort Worth metroplex
Cities in Texas
Cities in Tarrant County, Texas
Populated places established in 1957